The prehistoric family Phyllothecaceae, of the plant order Equisetales,  was erected in 1828, when Brongniart described the type species Phyllotheca australis coming from Hawkesbury River, Australia.

It existed during the Permian Period.

References

Equisetales
Permian plants
Prehistoric plant families
Permian first appearances
Permian genus extinctions
Monogeneric plant families